Priory Heath Division, Suffolk is an electoral division of Suffolk which returns one county councillor to Suffolk County Council. It is located in the South East Area of Ipswich and equates to Priory Heath Ward of Ipswich Borough Council.

Councillors
The following councillors were elected since 2001.

References

Electoral Divisions of Suffolk
South East Area, Ipswich